Ongarato is an Italian surname. Notable people with the surname include:

 Alberto Ongarato (born 1975), Italian cyclist
 Franco Ongarato (born 1949), Italian cyclist

Italian-language surnames